Ogut is a village in the municipality of Kriva Palanka, North Macedonia.

Demographics
According to the 2002 census, the village had a total of 152 inhabitants. Ethnic groups in the village include:

Macedonians 147
Serbs 5

References

Villages in Kriva Palanka Municipality